Aglaonice is a genus of moths of the family Erebidae. The genus was erected by Heinrich Benno Möschler in 1890.

Taxonomy
The genus has been previously classified in the subfamily Phytometrinae of Erebidae or in the family Noctuidae.

Species
Aglaonice hirtipalpis (Walker, [1859])
Aglaonice otignatha Hampson, 1924

References

Boletobiinae
Noctuoidea genera